Margy is a feminine given name. Notable people with the name include:

 Margy Conditt, former Republican member of the Ohio House of Representatives
 Margy Hart, New York City stripteaser
 Margy Kinmonth, British film director and producer
 Margy Osmond, Australian businesswoman
 Margy Reed, birth name of Martha Raye
 Margy Windeyer, Australian librarian and feminist

See also
 Margie
 Marji

Feminine given names